A1 Tin Maung (7 August 1908 – 4 October 2000) was a two-time Burmese Academy Award-winning film actor, director and producer.

Biography
Tin Maung was born in Pyay, a small town in Lower Burma during the British colonial rule. The youngest brother of Nyi Pu, a famous Burmese actor of early Burmese cinema, Tin Maung began his film career at age 10, in 1923, appearing in Taw Myaing Zon Ga Lwan Aung Phan. In 1934, while enrolled in Rangoon University, Tin Maung joined the A1 Film Company–the preeminent film studio of the time to appear in the film Mya Ganaing. He quickly became known as A1 Tin Maung, one of the studio's stable of stars.

In 1937, Tin Maung directed Aung Thabyay about the final days of King Thibaw, Burma's last monarch, who died an embittered man in exile in India. However, few Burmese got to see it initially, as the colonial government did not allow to the movie to play at theaters. In 1942, during World War II, Tin Maung enlisted in the Burma Independence Army to fight against the British colonialists.

After the war, Tin Maung returned to a film career at A1, increasingly focused on directing. He visited several Asian countries (Indonesia in 1950, India in 1954 and Japan in 1955) to learn directing and film production techniques. He won the Burmese Academy Award for best actor with the 1953 film Yadanabon. He also won another Academy Award for best director with Ko Ye, Toe Ye, Soe Soe Ye in 1967. Tin Maung was chairman of the Film Council (later, Myanmar Motion Picture Organization) from 1964 to 1966.

Tin Maung was married to Tin Tin, and had six children. He lived in Yangon and died on 4 October 2000.

Filmography
The Emerald Jungle (1934)
Ta Lane Nit Lane
Chit Ta Mya
Aung Thabyay (1937)
Chit A Mhya (1940)
Chit Yay Sin (1940)
Chit Sa Noe
Min Kaba Le
bar ma hti
Chain Tan Pyi (1948)
Chit Thet Wai (1952)
Hpuza Shin
Pyo Do Maung
bhain Ma tar ya
Nit Mwar A Theal
Moe Nya Einmet Myu
thu ka Lae chit ya mae
ta man kyar
Zarti Thway
Zin Ma so taw main ka lay
Chit Myay
Chit Mone Man
Yout Sein
Gone Ye Ma Thu
Myay De Thitsa
Latt Oo Sayar
Po Hnin Phyu
Yin We Khin Twe Zaw Lay Ye
a kyaw a mar
Yadanabon (1953)
Ko Yal Toe Yal Soe Soe Yal (1967)

References

1908 births
2000 deaths
Burmese male film actors
Burmese film directors
Burmese film producers
University of Yangon alumni
People from Bago Region
20th-century Burmese male actors
Recipients of the Alinkar Kyawswar